Phaegoptera albescens is a moth of the family Erebidae. It was described by Travassos in 1955. It is found in Brazil.

References

Phaegoptera
Moths described in 1955